Debate Team is an American power pop band from Los Angeles, California, consisting of vocalist Ryan McNeill, drummer Dan Konopka of OK Go, guitarist Drew Brown of OneRepublic, bassist Bob Morris of The Hush Sound and keyboardist Adam James.

Their debut extended play, Wins Again, was released independently on January 24, 2011.

Origin
The band started out as a recording project by flatmates Brown and McNeill. Both had an interest in artists such as Elvis Costello and Queen.

With the success of Brown's main project, OneRepublic, the band went on hiatus until 2008. In 2009, Konopka, James and Morris joined Brown and McNeill to complete the band.

Wins Again
Throughout 2009 and 2010, the band began recording Wins Again. The EP was set to be released in Summer 2010, but was delayed until the start of 2011. In the meantime, the band released the tracks "Christmastime Alone", "Curious Pair", "My Expertise" and "Leave" onto their Facebook page.

Untitled EP
On November 3, 2010, the band mentioned on their Facebook page that their second EP was being recorded. The date and title of this release are still unknown.

See also

 List of bands from Los Angeles
 List of indie pop artists
 List of indie rock musicians
 Music of Los Angeles

References

See also
 , the band's official website
 

2006 establishments in California
Indie pop groups from Los Angeles
Indie rock musical groups from California
American power pop groups
Musical groups established in 2006